Javier "Javi" López Carballo (born 25 March 2002) is a Spanish professional footballer who plays as a left back for Deportivo Alavés.

Club career
Born in La Orotava, Santa Cruz de Tenerife, Canary Islands, López represented UD Orotava and CD Tenerife before joining Deportivo Alavés' youth setup in 2017. The following March, he renewed his contract until 2020.

López made his senior debut with the reserves on 22 September 2018 at the age of just 16, by starting in a 0–0 Tercera División home draw against Real Sociedad C. In March of the following year, he further extended his contract until 2023, being definitely promoted to the main squad ahead of the 2020–21 campaign.

On 21 June 2020, aged 18, López made his first team – and La Liga – debut, starting in a 0–6 away loss against RC Celta de Vigo.

Career statistics

Club

References

External links

2002 births
Living people
People from Tenerife
Sportspeople from the Province of Santa Cruz de Tenerife
Footballers from the Canary Islands
Spanish footballers
Association football defenders
La Liga players
Segunda División B players
Tercera División players
Deportivo Alavés B players
Deportivo Alavés players
Spain youth international footballers